The title Baron Roberts has been held by three people:

 Frederick Roberts, 1st Earl Roberts (1832–1914), British general, created Baron Roberts of Kandahar in 1892
 Wyn Roberts, Baron Roberts of Conwy (b. 1930), Welsh Conservative politician
 Roger Roberts, Baron Roberts of Llandudno (b. 1935), Welsh Liberal Democrat politician